Samuel John Brassington (6 May 1901 – 4 October 1950) was an Australian politician. He was a Labor member of the Legislative Assembly of Queensland, serving as the member for Balonne from 1927 to 1932 and for Fortitude Valley from 1933 to 1950. He served as Speaker of the Legislative Assembly of Queensland from 1944 to 1950.

Upon his death in 1950, Brassington was accorded a State funeral which was held at St Stephen's Cathedral and proceeded to Toowong Cemetery.

References

1901 births
1950 deaths
Members of the Queensland Legislative Assembly
Speakers of the Queensland Legislative Assembly
Place of birth missing
Burials at Toowong Cemetery
Australian Labor Party members of the Parliament of Queensland
20th-century Australian politicians